Iona Capital Ltd  is a fund management company, managing equity and debt for private and institutional investors. The fund manager seeks to invest in start-up companies that contribute to the UK Government target of reducing waste sent to landfill and places emphasis on strong management teams.

History 

The Company was established by Nick Ross and Mike Dunn in 2011 with a focus on renewable energy infrastructure projects. Since its conception, the Iona Capital Ltd has been making financially driven investments primarily in the Anaerobic Digestion (AD) plants. Mike Dunn brought 20 years of waste management and investment infrastructure experience to the company. Nick Ross has a broad range of investment experience having sat on a number of investee company boards. The company moved into their new offices at 123 Pall Mall, in March 2019.

Funds under management

Iona Environmental Infrastructure LP (IEILP) 

IEILP was established in 2011 to attract institutional investors to invest in Anaerobic Digestion (AD) or In-vessel composting (IVC) plant operations, or companies demonstrating similar investment characteristics

Iona Environmental Infrastructure 2 LP (IEILP 2) 

IEILP 2 was established in 2013 with a similar investment mandate to IEILP 1.  It closed at £120m and has subsequently been fully invested in large electrical anaerobic digestion plants and biomass combined heat and power infrastructure, often in partnership with commercial power offtakers.  The build out of the IEILP 2 assets has been completed, and these assets are now contributing to the decarbonisation of the UK electricity grid.

Iona North West Environmental Infrastructure LP (IEILP NW) 

In parallel with the raise of IEILP 2, Iona Capital also raised a £25m regional fund for investment in environmental infrastructure to support the economy of North West England. This fund has invested in anaerobic digestion, biomass cogeneration assets, and advanced bio waste treatment technologies.

Iona Environmental Infrastructure 3 LP (IEILP 3) 

IEILP 3 is being raised with a similar investment mandate and strategy to the previous funds.  It carried out a soft close of £90m in Autumn 2016, and will close out at £250m in the next 12 to 18 months.  Whilst decarbonising the gas grid through the injection of biomethane remains a cornerstone of the investment strategy, the majority of the fund will be invested in energy from waste projects to promote efficient resource recovery and divert waste from UK land fill.

Strategic Areas of Investment Focus

What is Climate Change? 
The issue of climate change is one that has rapidly gained traction in the last ten years as there has been an unprecedented increase in the Earth's temperature. Scientist's argue that the reason behind this involves the trapping of the sun's heat in the Earth's lower atmosphere, due to greenhouse gases in the upper atmosphere re-reflecting heat energy back onto the earth.

Two Degrees of Climate Change 
The UK has specific targets which need to be met if the country is going to meet its commitments under the Paris Accords.  Whilst the decarbonisation of the UK electricity grid is notable success story, there is still a significant increase in renewable electricity generation capacity required over the next two decades.  Much more investment and innovation is required to decarbonise the provision of heat and transport.  Iona Capital aims to support these national objectives by investing in environmental infrastructure such as heat networks, energy from waste and anaerobic digestion projects whilst closely monitoring the changing commercial viability of nascent technologies such geothermal heat and power, hydrogen and tidal energy conversion.

Integrated Energy Service Solutions 

The integration of renewable technologies and bridging technologies such as natural gas cogeneration provides energy users with cost effective solutions to significantly reduce the carbon intensity of goods and services.

Resource Efficiency and the Circular Economy 

A key part of meeting the requirements of the Paris Accords is promoting the move from a linear to a circular economy where resources and energy is reused, recycled and remains within the economic system to a far greater extent. Infrastructure which promotes resource efficiency and the circular economy has the potential to significantly contribute to limiting climate change to two degrees.

References

External links 
 Iona Capital Ltd (company website)

Private equity firms of the United Kingdom
Companies based in the City of Westminster